is a Japanese manga series written and illustrated by Shiro Otsuka. It was serialized in Shogakukan's Weekly Shōnen Sunday from August 2007 to May 2008, with its chapters collected in five tankōbon volumes.

Plot
At the end of the 21st century, the Earth is almost entirely covered by water. Human/fish hybrids known as "Fish-Halves" inherit the earth.

Characters

A sixteen-year-old Fish-Half that is part human, part great white shark, he has a tendency to go berserk whenever he smells blood, killing any humans that happen to be nearby. He is battling against the navy, as he tries to free himself from their influence.

A fourteen-year-old girl who was captured by the navy and rescued by Shark.

A young Fish-Half that is part human, part shellfish. Her island was attacked by the navy, causing her to join up with Shark.

As his name implies, he is a Fish-Half that is half human, half blue whale. He is also a rear admiral in the navy that Shark is fighting against.

Publication
Marine Hunter, written and illustrated by Shiro Otsuka, ran in Shogakukan Weekly Shōnen Sunday from August 8, 2007, to May 28, 2008. Shogakukan collected its chapters in five tankōbon volumes, released from October 18, 2007, to August 11, 2008.

The series was licensed in France by Pika Édition, and the five volumes were released from November 2, 2010 to July 6, 2011. The series was discontinued in 2013.

Volume list

Notes

References

Shogakukan manga
Shōnen manga